Jamber Khurd is a town located on 64 km Lahore Multan Rd and Union Council of Kasur District in the Punjab province of Pakistan. It is part of Pattoki Tehsil and is located at 31°8'10N 73°55'10E with an altitude of 190 meters. Basically it is agricultural land but it is converted into industrial area. More than 50 industries are operated in surrounding of the town (Century Paper & Board Mills, Haleeb Products, Gulshan & Gulistan Textile, Din Textile, Sapphire Textile, Nishat Power House etc.). There is no proper treatment of emission of chemical water and waste from these industries, which is directly fall in canal and produced different diseases & environment pollution. 
Khurd and Kalan Persian language word which means small and Big respectively when two villages have same name then it is distinguished as Kalan means Big and Khurd means Small with Village Name.

Facilities
Government facilitate Jamber Khurd with Govt. Primary School (Boys), Govt. High School (Boys), Govt. Primary School (Girls) and Govt. High School & College (Girls). There are many private schools working in the town. There is a Govt. Basic Health Care unit working but there is no full-time doctor (MBBS) available but a lady doctor is available in this hospital. Recently Govt. installed water filter plant at Mandi Chowk in the mid of the town (2017). There are two bank branches in the town (HBL & BOP). 24 hours transportation is available. Proper sewerage & water supply system is installed in whole town. Carpeted streets, Post Office, Police Station and necessities are available here.

References 

There are many private schools in Jamber Khurd. In particular, Rafiq Model School is a famous school.

Populated places in Kasur District